Events in the year 2020 in the Dominican Republic.

Incumbents
 President: Danilo Medina (until 16 August), Luis Abinader (starting 16 August)
 Vice President: Margarita Cedeño de Fernández (until 16 August), Raquel Peña de Antuña (starting 16 August)

Events
1 January – New Year's Day, national holiday 
 6 January – Day of Kings (Dia de Reyes), national holiday
 21 January – Our Lady of High Grace, national holiday
 26 January – Duarte's Birthday, national holiday
16 February – 2020 Dominican Republic municipal elections: Software problems force the suspension of the elections.
27 February – Independence Day, national holiday
10 April – Good Friday, national holiday
12 April - Easter, national holiday
 1 May - Labour Day, national holiday
31 May – Mother's Day
 11 June – Corpus Christi, national holiday
26 July - Father's Day
 16 August – Restoration Day, national holiday
 24 September - Our Lady of Mercy (Nuestra Senora de las Mercedes), national holiday
 6 November - Constitution Day, national holiday
 25 December - Christmas Day, national holiday
16 February – 2020 Dominican Republic municipal elections: Software problems force the suspension of the elections.
27 February – Independence Day, Dominican Republic
28 February – The Dominican Republic refuses to allow a British cruise ship to dock due to fears of COVID-19. The ship heads to St. Maarten.
1 March – First confirmed case of COVID-19 in the Dominican Republic.
16 April – Forty-two people die after drinking adulterated alcohol from three clandestine distilleries in the Dominican Republic.
5 July – In the 2020 Dominican Republic general election, Luis Abinader is elected president.
31 July – Hurricane Isaias batters the Dominican Republic, killing two.
23 August – Tropical Storm Laura, which would later become Hurricane Laura, kills four people, and causes nearly 1.1 million people to lose power.
25 August – The Dominican Republic is the only member of the United Nations Security Council to support an effort by the United States to "snap back" sanctions against Iran.
31 August – Authorities break up a gang that falsified Spanish passports to facilitate emigration.

Deaths

4 January – Puerto Plata, musician (b. 1923).
15 February – Tony Fernández, 57, baseball player (b. 1962).
24 March – Jenny Polanco, fashion designer (b. 1958); COVID-19.
15 April – Dámaso García, 63, baseball player (b. 1957).
16 July – Víctor Víctor, singer-songwriter and guitarist (b. 1948); COVID-19.
19 December – Carmen Quidiello, 105, playwright and poet, former First Lady (b. 1915).

See also

COVID-19 pandemic in the Dominican Republic
2020 in the Caribbean
2020 in Haiti
2020 Atlantic hurricane season

References

 
2020s in the Dominican Republic
Years of the 21st century in the Dominican Republic
Dominican Republic
Dominican Republic